The 2013 season was the St. Louis Rams' 76th in the National Football League, their 19th in St. Louis and their second under head coach Jeff Fisher. The Rams equaled their win total from 2012, but missed the playoffs for a ninth consecutive season.

Week 7 saw Sam Bradford make his final appearance in a Rams uniform, as he tore his ACL in a game against the Carolina Panthers. That same injury prevented him from playing in the 2014 season, and he did not play another down in a Rams uniform as he was traded to the Philadelphia Eagles following the 2014 season.

2013 draft

Notes
 The Rams traded their first- (No. 16 overall), second- (No. 46 overall), original third- (No. 78 overall) and seventh- (No. 222 overall) round selections to the Buffalo Bills in exchange for the Bills' first- (No. 8) and third- (No. 71 overall) round selections.
 The Rams acquired an additional first-round selection – No. 22 overall – as part of a trade that sent their 2012 first-round selection to the Washington Redskins. The Rams later traded the No. 22 selection and a 2015 seventh-round selection (previously acquired in a 2012 trade that sent wide receiver Greg Salas to the New England Patriots) to the Atlanta Falcons in exchange for the Falcons' 2013 first-, third- and sixth- round selections – Nos. 30, 92 and 198 overall, respectively. The No. 198 selection, along with the Rams' original sixth-round selection (No. 184 overall), was traded to the Houston Texans in exchange for the Texans' fifth-round selection (No. 160 overall).

Staff

Final roster

Schedule

Preseason

Regular season

Note: Intra-division opponents are in bold text.

Game summaries

Week 1: vs. Arizona Cardinals

Week 2: at Atlanta Falcons

Week 3: at Dallas Cowboys

Week 4: vs. San Francisco 49ers

Week 5: vs. Jacksonville Jaguars

Week 6: at Houston Texans

Week 7: at Carolina Panthers

Tempers flared all game long. Not only did the Rams lose the game 15–30, but they lost two starters; defensive end Chris Long was ejected after throwing a punch and quarterback Sam Bradford suffered a season-ending knee injury after running out of bounds. It would also be Sam Bradford's last game in a Rams uniform as he missed all of 2014 with the same injury to the same knee and was traded to the Philadelphia Eagles in 2015.

Week 8: vs. Seattle Seahawks

With Kellen Clemens taking over for the rest of season, the Rams defense did their best, sacking Russell Wilson seven times. However, despite that, the Seahawks would go on to stun the Rams 14–9.

Week 9: vs. Tennessee Titans

Week 10: at Indianapolis Colts

The Rams harassed Andrew Luck and the Colts all game long, stunning Indy with a 38-8 blowout. The game's highlights included Chris Long returning a fumble for a 45 yards to give the Rams the game's first points. Tavon Austin broke the hearts of Colts' fans with three touchdowns, one returned for 98 yards and two receptions.

Week 12: vs. Chicago Bears

Week 13: at San Francisco 49ers

Week 14: at Arizona Cardinals

With the loss, the Rams clinched their 10th consecutive non-winning season, and were officially eliminated from playoff contention.

Week 15: vs. New Orleans Saints

Week 16: vs. Tampa Bay Buccaneers

The Rams defense shut down the Buccaneers' offense throughout the game, but Jake Long tore his ACL, ending his season. Nevertheless, the Rams would win 23–13.

Week 17: at Seattle Seahawks

Traveling to Seattle for the second time in a row this season, the Rams once again could not respond as they would go on to lose their season finale, 27–9.

Standings

Division

Conference

References

External links
 

St. Louis
St. Louis Rams
St. Louis Rams seasons